PUSH floods and ACK floods are denial of service attacks based on the PSH and ACK flags.

Since these flags require additional processing it may be possible to overwhelm a service by setting these flags on numerous requests.

Mitigation
Proxy filters may drop appropriate packets with these flags set when the system is considered to be under attack.

See also
 SYN flood

References

Denial-of-service attacks